The Fourth Amendment of the Constitution Bill 1968 was a bill (no. 6 of 1968) to amend the Constitution of Ireland to alter the electoral system from proportional representation by means of the single transferable vote (PR-STV) to first-past-the-post (FPTP). The proposal was rejected in a referendum held on 16 October 1968.

Proposed change
The subject matter of the referendum was described as follows:

Background
Elections to Dáil Éireann, the house of representative in the Oireachtas, are governed by Article 16 of the Constitution.

In 1959, the Fianna Fáil government of Éamon de Valera put the Third Amendment of the Constitution Bill to a referendum, which proposed to replace the electoral system of proportional representation by means of the single transferable vote (PR-STV) with first-past-the-post (FPTP). The referendum was defeated by 51.8% to 48.8%, on the same day on which de Valera had won the presidential election.

In 1968, the Fianna Fáil government of Jack Lynch proposed two constitutional amendments on the electoral system for election to Dáil Éireann: the Third Amendment of the Constitution Bill, which would have allowed for greater divergence in the ratio of population to constituencies, and the Fourth Amendment of the Constitution Bill, a second proposal to introduce FPTP voting in single-member constituencies.

Oireachtas debate
The Amendment was proposed in the Dáil by Taoiseach Jack Lynch on 21 February 1968. The Amendment was opposed by Fine Gael and the Labour Party. On 3 July, it passed final stages in the Dáil by 66 votes to 56. On 30 July 1968, it passed final stages in the Seanad by 25 votes to 18. Referendums on both the Third Amendment Bill and the Fourth Amendment Bill were held on 16 October 1968.

Result
The Fourth Amendment bill was rejected by 60.8% against to 39.2% in favour; the Third Amendment, on the population ratio in constituencies, was rejected by a similar margin.

See also
Politics of the Republic of Ireland
History of the Republic of Ireland
Constitutional amendment
1968 Irish constitutional referendum

References

Sources

Citations

1968 in Irish law
1968 in Irish politics
1968 referendums
04
04a
Single transferable vote
October 1968 events in Europe
Amendment, 04, 1968
Amendment, 04, 1968
Electoral reform referendums